Persoonia oblongata is a plant in the family Proteaceae and is endemic to New South Wales. It is an erect to spreading shrub with narrow elliptic to broad egg-shaped leaves and yellow flowers on long, curved pedicels and is found from the lower Blue Mountains, west to Rylstone.

Description
Persoonia oblongata is an erect or spreading shrub with smooth bark and with hairy young growth. The leaves are more or less hairy when young but become glabrous with age and the upper and lower surfaces are the same colour. The central style is surrounded by four yellow anthers which are also joined at the base with the tips rolled back, so that it resembles a cross when viewed end-on. The ovary and tepals are sometimes sparsely hairy. Flowering occurs from October to April and is followed by fruit which are drupes.

Taxonomy and naming
Persoonia oblongata was first formally described in 1830 by Robert Brown and the description was published in Supplementum primum Prodromi florae Novae Hollandiae. The specific epithet (oblongata) is derived from the Latin word oblongus meaning "longer than broad".

Distribution and habitat
This persoonia grows in heath and forest between Glenbrook, Yengo National Park and Rylstone.

References

Flora of New South Wales
oblongata
Proteales of Australia
Taxa named by Robert Brown (botanist, born 1773)
Plants described in 1830